Heady is a surname. Notable people with the surname include:

 Brett Heady (born 1970), Australian rules footballer
 Harold Franklin Heady (1916–2011), American forester and ecologist
 Morrison Heady (1829–1915), American poet
 Ray E. Heady (1916–2002), American clergyman

See also
Lena Headey, Bermudan-English actress